Rewind is the second studio album from Christian hip hop artist Flame, released on December 6, 2005.

Track listing

2005 albums
Flame (rapper) albums
Cross Movement Records albums
Albums produced by Lecrae
Albums produced by DJ Official